Darreh-ye Mirak (also Romanized as Darreh-ye Mīrak; also known as Darreh, Darreh-i-Aulia, Darreh ‘Olyā, and Darreh-ye Bālā) is a village in Baqeran Rural District, in the Central District of Birjand County, South Khorasan Province, Iran. At the 2006 census, its population was 5, in 4 families.

References 

Populated places in Birjand County